According to The Book of Mormon, a group of refugees from the land of Lehi-Nephi paused in this valley long enough to pitch their tents (probably one night). They gave to the valley the name of their leader, Alma, a former priest of king Noah.

Alma had been teaching and baptizing in the waters of Mormon when they learned that the army of king Noah was on its way. They fled into the wilderness. After traveling eight days the people settled in a land of "pure water" and named the settlement Helam. A period of prosperity followed, until they were discovered by Amulon and the Lamanites, who repressed the people for a time. Sometime later the people, led by Alma the Elder, escaped. After traveling all day, they came to a valley, named it Alma, and probably stayed the night. From there they traveled in the wilderness for twelve days until they reached the land of Zarahemla.

References 

Book of Mormon places